Bill Dowdy (August 15, 1932 – May 12, 2017) was an American jazz musician and teacher. He was the drummer with the jazz trio, The Three Sounds. The Three Sounds recorded over ten jazz albums from the 1950s through the early 1970s and played with Lester Young, Lou Donaldson, Nat Adderley, Johnny Griffin, Anita O'Day and Sonny Stitt among others.

Biography
Bill Dowdy was born in Osceola, Arkansas. He moved with his family to Benton Harbor, Michigan when he was six months old. At a young age he would beat on things as if he were playing the drums, an indication of his future musical career. In high school he learned to play the piano and the drums. He had a group called Club 49 Trio in 1949 which group played on the radio in Chicago.

After Dowdy started his own music group, he moved to Battle Creek and joined a band before being drafted by the Army. Afterwards he moved to Chicago and took private lessons to improve his musical skills. Over time Dowdy became a professional drummer, eventually playing with many blues bands. Dowdy continued traveling, from New York to Los Angeles, and from Canada to the south. His idols included Gene Krupa, Max Roach, Roy Haynes, and Tony Williams.

Dowdy died on May 12, 2017.

Discography
With The Three Sounds
1958: Introducing the 3 Sounds (Blue Note)
1958: Branching Out (Blue Note) with Nat Adderley
1959: Bottoms Up! (Blue Note)
1959: LD + 3 (Blue Note) with Lou Donaldson
1959: Good Deal (Blue Note)
1960: Moods (Blue Note) 
1960: Feelin' Good (Blue Note)
1960: Here We Come (Blue Note)
1960: It Just Got to Be (Blue Note)
1960: Blue Hour (Blue Note) with Stanley Turrentine
1961: Hey There (Blue Note)
1961: Babe's Blues (Blue Note)
1962: Out of This World (Blue Note)
1962: Black Orchid (Blue Note)
1959/62: Standards released 1998
1962: Blue Genes (Verve)
1963: Anita O'Day & the Three Sounds (Verve)
1963: The Three Sounds Play Jazz on Broadway (Mercury)
1963: Some Like It Modern (Mercury)
1964: Live at the Living Room (Mercury)
1965: Three Moods (Limelight)
1965: Beautiful Friendship (Limelight)

References

Notes
 The Encyclopedia of Jazz. Leonard G. Feather. 1984. P. 185.
 The Giants of Jazz Piano. Backbeat Books. 2001. P. 184–186. "(History of the Three Sounds)"

1932 births
2017 deaths
African-American drummers
American jazz drummers
Jazz musicians from Arkansas
The Three Sounds members
20th-century African-American people
21st-century African-American people